Major-General Robert William Ward  (born 17 October 1935) is a former British Army officer.

Military career
Educated at Rugby School and the Royal Military Academy Sandhurst, Ward was commissioned into the 2nd Dragoon Guards (Queen's Bays) in 1955. He became commanding officer of the 1st The Queen's Dragoon Guards in 1975. He went on to be commander of 22nd Armoured Brigade in 1977, Assistant Chief of Staff, Northern Army Group in 1983 and General Officer Commanding Western District in 1986 before retiring in 1989.

In 1966 he married Lavinia Dorothy Cramsie; they have two sons and one daughter.

References

 

1931 births
Living people
British Army generals
Companions of the Order of the Bath
Members of the Order of the British Empire
2nd Dragoon Guards (Queen's Bays) officers
1st The Queen's Dragoon Guards officers
Deputy Lieutenants of Shropshire